Manoranjan Talukdar is an Indian politician member of Communist Party of India (Marxist) from Assam.  He is an MLA, elected from the Sorbhog constituency in the 2021 Assam Legislative Assembly election.

References 

Communist Party of India (Marxist) politicians from Assam
Living people
Year of birth missing (living people)
Assam MLAs 2021–2026
People from Barpeta district